Vivan Alexander Lindaman (October 28, 1877 – February 13, 1927) was a professional baseball player who played pitcher in the Major Leagues from 1906 to 1909.

Lindaman went 24–7 for the Eastern League's Jersey City Skeeters in 1905, and he made his major league debut the following season. In his first start with the Boston Beaneaters, he shut out Brooklyn 1–0. Despite throwing 32 complete games (third in the league) as a rookie, he finished 12–23; his team was shut out in eight of his losses.

Lindaman kept in shape by walking 17 miles a day as a mail carrier.

References

External links

1877 births
1927 deaths
Major League Baseball pitchers
Baseball players from Iowa
Boston Beaneaters players
Boston Doves players
Sioux City Soos players
Jersey City Skeeters players
Indianapolis Indians players
People from Charles City, Iowa